Semyon Grigoryevich Firin (Russian: Семён Григорьевич Фирин; June 30, 1898 – August 14, 1937) was a Soviet officer in the intelligence services OGPU and NKVD. Later in his career, he was a leader in different Gulag forced labor camps until he was executed during the Great Purge.

Life and career
Firin was born to a Jewish family. His original surname was Pupko. In the 1920s, he served as an intelligence officer in various European countries.

He became the deputy chief of White Sea–Baltic Canal forced labor camp under the supervision of Matvei Berman in 1932. He was awarded the Order of Lenin for his  participation in the management of the construction of the canal in 1933. Aleksandr Solzhenitsyn named Semyon Firin as one of the six supervisors responsible for 30,000 deaths during the construction of the canal in his book The Gulag Archipelago.

After the White-Sea Baltic Canal was finished, he became the leading NKVD official alongside Sergey Zhuk and Lazar Kogan in the Dmitlag forced labor camp based in Dmitrov where the inmates were building the Moscow Canal. In August 1933, Firin was upset that there were too many frail workers who were not meeting production goals. He ordered the camp leaders to cut their food rations as a punishment which meant they only got weaker and thus were "unloaded". 

Firin was arrested for allegedly participating in an Operational-Chekist coup to prepare a "palace revolution" on 28 April 1937. He was executed by a firing squad on 14 August, 1937.

References 

1898 births
1937 deaths
Cheka officers
NKVD officers
People from Vilnius
People from Vilna Governorate
Russian Jews
Jewish socialists
Old Bolsheviks
Great Purge victims from Russia 
Jews executed by the Soviet Union
People executed for treason against the Soviet Union
Deaths by firearm in Russia
Soviet rehabilitations
Gulag governors